Carl Gustaf Emil Mannerheim (1867–1951) was a Finnish military leader and statesman.

Mannerheim may also refer to:

Surname 
 Mannerheim (family), a noble family
 Carl Erik Mannerheim (1759–1837), Finnish vice chairman and statesman
 Carl Gustaf Mannerheim (naturalist) (1797–1854), Finnish entomologist
 Carl Robert Mannerheim (1835–1914), Finnish aristocrat and businessman
 Sophie Mannerheim (1863–1928), Finnish nurse
 Jenny Mannerheim (born 1977), Swedish art director

Other uses 
 Mannerheim (film), a cancelled film
 Mannerheim Cross, a Finnish military decoration
 Mannerheim League for Child Welfare, a Finnish non-governmental organization
 Mannerheim Line, a defensive line during the Winter War
 Mannerheim Museum, a museum in Helsinki, Finland
 Mannerheim Park
 Mannerheim Park, Seinäjoki, a park in Seinäjoki, Finland
 Mannerheim Park, Oulu, a park in Oulu, Finland
 Mannerheimintie ("Mannerheim Road"), a boulevard and main street in Helsinki, Finland

See also